St Patrick's College is a state-integrated Catholic boys' day and boarding secondary school located in Silverstream, Upper Hutt, New Zealand. It was established in 1931 when the original St Patrick's College, Wellington that had been established in 1885 was intended to be moved to a larger site more suited to a boarding school, but both colleges survived as independent institutions.

History 
St Patrick's College in Silverstream was established by the Society of Mary (Marist Fathers) in 1931 when the original St Patrick's College, Wellington (established 1885) was intended to be moved to a larger site more suited to a boarding school. Both colleges survived. Today, they share not only a common history, motto and spirit but also a good natured rivalry and competition in many endeavours. Silverstreamers refer to the mother school as 'Town'.

The Silverstream College, often referred to simply by the suburb title or 'Stream', is on seven hectares of grounds between the Hutt River and Silverstream Railway Station close to the suburbs of Silverstream and Heretaunga. As a state-integrated school, St Patrick's College is funded by the Society of Mary, Catholic Schools Board Limited and the New Zealand Government.

In the 1980s, St Patrick's record was marred by a member of staff being involved in incidents of sexual abuse involving students. Reports of this sexual abuse were allegedly suppressed by the school Marist priests.

At its foundation much of the original College was transferred from the Wellington site including many of the Marist teachers, much of the memorabilia and the College colours. The brother Colleges today share an Old Boys' Association in recognition of their common heritage. School sports teams have enjoyed success in Rugby union, cricket and athletics. Football, hockey and basketball are popular winter sports at the college. Both Of St Patrick's Colleges also compete against each other in an annual event called “McEvedy” similar to the athletics of Old Boys but it is shared with two other schools, Wellington College and Rongotai College. Over the years of the College it has evolved from being primarily a boarding school into a largely day school with a small boarding facility. This demographic shift has resulted from several pressures including the huge increase in number of residents in the local area. In more recent years it has been necessary to cap the roll and introduce an enrolment scheme to ensure an equitable educational outcome for all local pupils. The College celebrated its 75th Jubilee in 2006.

St Patrick's College as a Catholic School bases its educational philosophy on Christian teachings and on the Marist tradition under which the school was founded. In 2012 the St Patrick's College, Silverstream Foundation was established.

Demographics
At the October 2011 Education Review Office (ERO) review, St Patrick's Silverstream had 712 students enrolled. Sixty-six percent of students identified as New Zealand European (Pākehā), 14 percent identified as Māori, ten percent as Pacific Islanders, five percent as Asian, and five percent as another ethnicity.

St Patrick's Silverstream has a socio-economic decile of 8 (step P), meaning it draws its school community from areas of moderately-high socioeconomic status when compared to other New Zealand schools. The school was recategorised from decile 9 (step Q) in January 2015, as part of the nationwide review of deciles following the 2013 census.

Sexual abuse of children 
Sexual abuse allegations have been made against at least five priests who taught at St. Patrick's College, Silverstream:

 Francis Durning, former Rector of the college during the 1950s. 
 Father Patrick F Minto SM, BA (1971–1974) former Rector of the college 
AM Donnelly, who taught at St Pat's from 1968 to 1974
 Alan Woodcock abused children at St John's College in Hastings, St Patrick's College in Upper Hutt, Highden in the Manawatu and Futuna in Wellington. After he left the Marist Priesthood and left New Zealand to live in England, he was extradited back to New Zealand and was convicted in 2004 of 21 sex offences committed against 11 children between 1978 and 1987 and sentenced to 7 years in prison. The abuse at St Pats Silverstream continued even after being reported to school rector Father Michael “Vince” Curtain and Marist order head Father Fred Bliss. Woodcock was moved to another Catholic institution in Palmerston North by Bliss and he continued to abuse children. Tracking him down abroad was done with the assistance of the Sisters of St Joseph of Nazareth. In the late 1980s, he took up residence in the England, where he was arrested in 2002.
 Michael Shirres, the celebrated theologian, was exposed by the New Zealand Herald as a paedophile and has admitted to molesting dozens of children.

For related information see, Catholic Church sexual abuse cases in New Zealand.

Notable alumni (old Patricians or Silverstreamers)

The college encourages former students to join the St. Patrick's College Old Boys Association (SPCOBA). The Association is based in Wellington and caters for Old Boys of both the Silverstream and Town colleges. Notable Old Silverstreamers include (with years attending the college in parentheses where available):

Academia
 Antony F. Campbell (1934 – 2020) Jesuit priest, Old Testament scholar.
 Michael King (historian) (1945 – 2004)

The Arts
 Patrick Power – opera singer
 Vincent Ward – cinematographer
 Tapiwa Mutingwende (TAPZ) – musician

Broadcasting
 Martin Devlin – sports journalist and broadcaster
 Mark Sainsbury, (1970–1974) – broadcaster
 Spiro Zavos, (1951–1955) – journalist and author

Business
 Michael Fay – financier
 Pat Goodman – co-founder Goodman Fielder Wattie

Politics and public service
 Mark O'Regan, – New Zealand Supreme Court Judge
 Tufuga Efi, Tupua Tamasese Tupuola Tufuga Efi – former Prime Minister and head of state of Samoa
 Bill English, (1975–1979) – 39th Prime Minister of New Zealand
 Matthew Tukaki, (1988–1992) – Ex Officio Director of the Board, United Nations Global Compact Board (UNGC), Australian Representative (UNGC), Director of the Boards of Suicide Prevention Australia and the Australian Indigenous Chamber of Commerce, Chairman of the Pacific Energy Corporation
 Wayne Guppy, (1968–1972) – Mayor of Upper Hutt
 Rex S Kirton, (1955–1959) – Mayor of Upper Hutt
 Mike Minogue, (1940–1942) – Mayor of Hamilton

Religion
 Wiremu Te Awhitu, (1932–35) – first Māori Catholic priest
 Owen Dolan, (1942–1944)- Coadjutor Bishop emeritus of Palmerston North
 Robin Leamy, (1947–1951) – Bishop of Rarotonga (1984–1996); Auxiliary Bishop of Auckland (1996 – )
 Stuart France O'Connell (1949–1953) (born 1935) – Fifth Catholic Bishop of Rarotonga (1996–2011)
 John Rodgers

Science
 John Daniel Bergin, (1933–1937) – neurologist and Second World War veteran (b 1921 d 1995)

Sport
 Blair Cowan, (1999–2003) – Scottish rugby international (2014–)
 Patrick Hogan, KNZM, CBE – Race horse trainer and breeder
 Joe Karam (1964–1968) – All Black (1972–75) 10 tests
 Harry Dale Kent, (1960–1963) – world champion cyclist, Gold Medalist 1970 Commonwealth Games, 1970 NZ Sportsman of the Year
 Earle Kirton – All Black (1963-1970), 13 tests 
 John Leslie, (1984–1988) – Otago and Scottish rugby union player
 Martin Leslie, (1985–1989) – rugby union player, Scottish national team
 Simon Mannix, (1985–1989) – All Black (1994) 1 test
 Aaron Persico (1992–1996) – rugby union player, Italian national team
 Scott Waldrom, (1994–1998) – All Black (2008)
 Thomas Waldrom, (1996–2000) – England Rugby Test Player (2012)
 Tyrel Lomax, (2009-2010) - All Black (2020-)
 Asafo Aumua, (2010-2014) - All Black (2020-)

List of rectors
The school Principal of the college is called the Rector.

Very Rev. Father John W Dowling, SM, MA, AFRES (1931–1937)
Very Rev. Father John J Kennedy, SM, MA (1938–1943)
Very Rev. Father Leo R Evatt, SM, BA, QSM (1944–1949)
Very Rev. Father Francis A Durning, SM, MA (1950–1955), mentioned in the NZ Royal Commission of Inquiry into Abuse in Care hearings in Nov. 2020 
Very Rev. Father Maurice Bourke, SM, BA (1956–1961)
Very Rev. Father John R Parker SM, MA (1962–1966)
Very Rev. Father Kevin A O'Conner SM, BSc ANZIC (1967)
Very Rev. Father Gerard P Gill, SM BA (1968–1970)
Very Rev. Father Patrick F Minto SM, BA (1971–1974), mentioned in the NZ Royal Commission of Inquiry into Abuse in Care hearings in Nov. 2020 
Very Rev. Father Frederick M Bliss SM, MA (CUA), BA (Vic), LTCL (1974–1980)
Very Rev. Father Michael V Curtain, SM, BA (1981–1987)
Very Rev. Father James T Dooley, SM, BA, BSc (1987–1993)
Mr. David P Leavy, BA, BEd (Liverpool), DipEd (1994–2006)
Mr. Philip Mahoney, BSc, PGDip Theol&Spir, MEdL (2006–2010) – Resigned from Ordained Ministry prior to appointment.
Mr. Gerard Tully, BPhED, BSc, Dip Tchg (2011–2017)
Mr. Graham Duffy, B.A. Dip Tchg (2018–2021)
Mr. Steve Bryan, (Acting Rector February-May 2022)
Mr. Robert Ferreira, (May 2022 - Present)

Notes

Boarding schools in New Zealand
Boys' schools in New Zealand
Educational institutions established in 1931
1931 establishments in New Zealand
Catholic secondary schools in the Wellington Region
Schools in Upper Hutt